Thomas Breakwell (3 July 1915 – after 1937) was an English professional footballer. A left half, he played for four Football League clubs in the 1930s.

Career
Breakwell began his career with Blackpool in 1933. After failing to get into the first team, however, he joined nearby Lytham. In 1935, he joined Bolton Wanderers, but again did not make a first-team appearance.

In 1936, he signed for Bradford Park Avenue, and went on to make eighteen League appearances for the club. The following year he joined the Welsh club Wrexham, for whom he made three League appearances.

He finished his career back on the Fylde with Fleetwood.

References

1915 births
Year of death missing
People from Stourport-on-Severn
English footballers
Association football wing halves
Blackpool F.C. players
Lytham F.C. players
Bolton Wanderers F.C. players
Bradford (Park Avenue) A.F.C. players
Wrexham A.F.C. players
Fleetwood Town F.C. players
English Football League players
Sportspeople from Worcestershire